The Ringwood West Line was a World War II defensive line in England, running south from the GHQ Line near Frome to the coast.

The line followed natural and manmade barriers such as rivers and canals, and was strengthened by pillboxes, gun emplacements and anti tank obstacles. In the event of an actual invasion, it was planned mines would be laid and key crossing points such as bridges demolished.

See also
British anti-invasion preparations of World War II
British hardened field defences of World War II
Taunton Stop Line
GHQ Line
Outer London Defence Ring
Bridgwater and Taunton Canal

British World War II defensive lines